Rakesh Kumar Jain (born December 24, 1957) is an Indian virologist and the former head and coordinator of the Microbial Type Culture Collection (MTCC), a national research centre located at the Institute of Microbial Technology campus. He is known for his research in virology. His studies have been documented by way of a number of articles and the online article repository of John Wiley & Sons has listed several of them. Besides, he has edited one book, A Century of Plant Virology in India, an 805-page volume compiling the research done in the field of plant virology in India during the last 100 years. The Department of Biotechnology of the Government of India awarded him the National Bioscience Award for Career Development, one of the highest Indian science awards, for his contributions to biosciences in 2002.

Selected bibliography

Books

Articles

Notes

References 

N-BIOS Prize recipients
Indian medical academics
Indian scientific authors
Fellows of The National Academy of Sciences, India
1958 births
Living people
Indian virologists